Southern Pacific Railroad's MC-4 class of steam locomotive was the second class ordered and built as cab forward locomotives.  Southern Pacific (SP) found the MC-2 class sufficient for a proof-of-concept for cab forward locomotives and sought to continue with now tested designs.

In service, SP found that the locomotives were a little too slow for the traffic needs.  By 1930, all of the MC-4 class had been "simpled" to use uniform size cylinders and feedwater heaters were installed to address the issue.  They were then reclassified as AC-2 locomotives.  As rebuilt, the locomotives continued in service through the end of World War II.

References 
 

MC-4
2-8-8-2 locomotives
Baldwin locomotives
Mallet locomotives
Steam locomotives of the United States
Railway locomotives introduced in 1911
Scrapped locomotives
Standard gauge locomotives of the United States